Rhythm is an Indian romantic musical film produced, directed  and written by Vivek Kumar. The film production initially began in 2011 and was finally released on 26 February 2016 after being delayed for almost five years.

Overview 
The film was presented by R. N. Kumar. It was written and directed by Vivek Kumar. Rhythm was in the making for over six years. It starred Adeel Chaudhry and Rinil Routh in the lead cast and is the Bollywood debut of Adeel Chaudhry. Rhythm was shot in Poland and was scheduled for release on 19 February 2016 but the release was later pushed to 26 February 2016.

Plot 
Avantika (Rinil Routh) and her group of friends are part of an inter-college music and dance festival. Meanwhile, a new boy, Rohan (played by Adeel Chaudhry) transfers to her college for advanced studies. He falls madly in love with Avantika, but due to a past failed relationship, Avantika has built a wall around herself and does not let people enter her life beyond a certain point. After a series of incidents, Avantika realises something which changes her life.

Cast 
 Adeel Chaudhry as Rohan
 Rinil Routh as Avantika
 Gurleen Chopra
 Kiran Srinivas
 Kosha Jayaswal
 Vibhu K Raghave
 Kuba Gras
 Syed Abid Bhushan

Soundtrack 

Music for the film was composed by Suresh Peters, Adeel Chaudhary , Pranay Rijia, Naveed Zafar and Junoon singer Salman Ahmed. Salman also made a guest appearance in the film as his Bollywood debut.

References

External links 
 
 

2010s Hindi-language films
2010s romantic musical films
2016 films
2016 romantic drama films
Films scored by Suresh Peters
Films shot in Poland
Indian romantic drama films
Indian romantic musical films